Chelsea Olivia Wijaya, better known by her stage name Chelsea Olivia, (born 29 July 1992) is an Indonesian actress and pop singer. Olivia is the youngest of three children. She is also a former grader of acceleration in one of the leading high schools in South Jakarta. Olivia graduated from high school at the age of 15 years.

Career

Early soap opera career
In her first foray in the world of modeling, Olivia made an album for her children. Once incorporated into Indika Entertainment she got a soap opera. But before this, she was starring in the soap opera Tuyul dan Mbak Yul in 1999 as guest star in episode 84. She became publicly known since starring in the soap opera Cincin, after the offer to play soap operas and advertisements come to her. Her name is increasingly discussed after starring in Buku Harian Nayla. Olivia studies at Tarakanita Primary School, St. Louis 1 Junior High, and Jakarta 6 High.

Dabbled in movies and music
In addition to playing the soap opera, Olivia, as a Christian (born and raised in the Protestant faith but converted to Catholicism), is busy singing with BBB (Bukan Bintang Biasa, Korean: 보통하지 않은 별, Botong Haji Ahneun Byul), a Korean Wave-type group singer made up from younger soap opera stars such as: Laudya Cynthia Bella, Raffi Ahmad, Dimas Beck dan Ayushita under the guidance of singer and songwriter Melly Goeslaw. The plan will also fill the BBB group's movie Soundtrack, entitled Bukan Bintang Biasa.

Personal life
The soap opera Buku Harian Nayla brings Glenn Alinskie, a new artist, to now become her lover. Glenn is reported to have officially dated Chelsea one day before her 15th birthday on 28 July 2007.
Chelsea has married Glenn on 3 October 2015, followed by their sensational honeymoon in a luxury resort in Bali, Samabe Bali Suites & Villas. They welcomed their first child, a daughter, on 9 September 2016.

Chelsea is a convert to Roman Catholicism from Protestantism.

Discography

Soundtrack album
 Ost. Bukan Bintang Biasa (2007)
 Ost. Antara Cinta dan Dusta (2011)

Single

Filmography

Films

Television

Advertisement

Awards and nominations

References

External links 
 Chelsea Olivia's Friendster

1992 births
21st-century Indonesian women singers
Indonesian pop singers
Indonesian people of Chinese descent
Indonesian film actresses
Indonesian television personalities
Indo people
Living people
Converts to Roman Catholicism from Protestantism
Indonesian Roman Catholics